Ḥumayda bint Numān ibn Bashīr was an Arabic-speaking female poet of the seventh century CE. She is noted for her satires on the failings of her various husbands.

References

7th-century women writers
7th-century Arabic poets
Women poets from the Umayyad Caliphate